Projector PSA, Inc. is a developer of cloud-based professional services automation (PSA) software. On July 12, 2022, the company was acquired by Big Time Software.

History 

Projector PSA was started in 2002 by a group of employees at Agency.com. Their self-developed application used to manage Agency.com became the prototype for Projector PSA's main software offering, Projector. In 2003 Projector PSA, Inc. was formed and in mid-2004 they released the first version of Projector.

Software 

Projector is a business application that is intended to be used by project-based organizations. Projector is considered Professional Services Automation, or PSA software. Projector is designed to help companies with project management, resource scheduling, and project accounting.

Projector is a cloud-based application that allows users to access the application anywhere they have an internet connection. Projector has two main interfaces, one called the Employee Portal and a second called the Management Portal. The Employee Portal is a browser-based application that has functionality for time entry, expense entry, document management, issue tracking, and viewing schedules. The Management Portal uses Window's Smart-Client technology and is where users go to manage projects, schedule resources, run reports, create invoices, and administer the application.

Projector has a mobile web application for time and expense entry that can be accessed on most smartphones.

Projector's software is sold using the Software-as-a-Service or SaaS licensing model, and is being used by more than 19,000 users across 180 companies worldwide.

Projector PSA runs a user group called the Projector e3 Community.

Awards and recognition 

Included in the Talking Cloud 2012 Top 100 Cloud Service Providers
Included in the Top 10 PSA Software Vendors by Business-Software.com
PSA with the highest level of customer satisfaction in the 2012 SPI Research Professional Services Benchmark Report

See also 

Professional Services Automation Software
Comparison of PSA Systems
Project Management Software
Comparison of Project Management Software
Time Tracking Software
Comparison of Time Tracking Software

References 

Business software
Business software companies
Project management software
Companies based in Boston
Companies established in 2003
2003 establishments in Massachusetts